The 2010–11 season was the 90th season in the existence of S.C. Braga and the club's 15th consecutive season in the top flight of Portuguese football. In addition to the domestic league, Braga participated in this season's editions of the Taça de Portugal and the UEFA Europa League.

Season summary
Braga endured a poor start to the 2010–11 season, including elimination from the Champions League in the group stage, in their first ever appearance in that competition. Results picked up and Braga finished the season in fourth. Greater success came in the Europa League, however, as Braga reached the final - their first and, as of 2021, only European final. André Villas-Boas' FC Porto won the final to complete a treble of the Portuguese league and cup and Europa League. Manager Domingos, who had announced his departure from Braga prior to the Europa League final, stuck to his word and departed for Sporting CP. Leonardo Jardim, most recently of Beira-Mar, was appointed as his successor.

Players

First team squad
Squad at end of season

Left club during season

Competitions

Overview

Primeira Liga

League table

References

Notes

S.C. Braga seasons
S.C. Braga